Erzsébet Márkus-Peresztegi (born August 23, 1969 in Sopron, Győr-Moson-Sopron) is a retired female weightlifter from Hungary. She became an Olympic medalist during the 2000 Summer Olympics when she won the silver medal in the women's – 69 kg class.

References

External links
 
 
 
 

1969 births
Living people
People from Sopron
Hungarian female weightlifters
Weightlifters at the 2000 Summer Olympics
Olympic silver medalists for Hungary
Olympic weightlifters of Hungary
Olympic medalists in weightlifting
Medalists at the 2000 Summer Olympics
European Weightlifting Championships medalists
World Weightlifting Championships medalists
Sportspeople from Győr-Moson-Sopron County
20th-century Hungarian women
21st-century Hungarian women